Sliding Easy is an album by American trombonist Curtis Fuller, recorded in 1959 and released on the United Artists label.

Reception

AllMusic awarded the album 3 stars.

Track listing
All compositions by Curtis Fuller except as indicated
 "Bit of Heaven" - 5:25   
 "Down Home" - 4:05   
 "I Wonder Where Our Love Has Gone" (Buddy Johnson) - 5:52   
 "Bongo Bop" (Charlie Parker) - 7:50   
 "When Lights Are Low" (Benny Carter, Spencer Williams) - 6:55   
 "C.T.A." (Jimmy Heath) - 5:09

Personnel
Curtis Fuller - trombone
Lee Morgan - trumpet
Hank Mobley - tenor saxophone
Tommy Flanagan - piano
Paul Chambers - bass
Elvin Jones - drums
Benny Golson (tracks 1, 3, 4 & 5), Gigi Gryce (tracks 2 & 6) - arranger

References 

1959 albums
United Artists Records albums
Curtis Fuller albums
Albums arranged by Benny Golson
Albums produced by Tom Wilson (record producer)